Rens van der Wacht (born 1 June 1999) is a Dutch professional footballer who plays as a midfielder.

Club career
Van der Wacht made his professional debut with Jong AZ in a 2–1 Eerste Divisie tie with Almere City FC on 20 September 2019. Van der Wacht's early career was impacted by injuries, as he spent almost 2 years out due to a knee infection and a hernia.

References

External links
 
 Ons Oranje U16 Profile
 Ons Oranje U17 Profile
 Ons Oranje U19 Profile

1999 births
Living people
Footballers from Zaanstad
Dutch footballers
Netherlands youth international footballers
Association football midfielders
Jong AZ players
Eerste Divisie players